Thomas Dudley Shepherd (August 2, 1889 – October 5, 1954) was an American college football player and coach. He served as the head football coach at New Hampshire College of Agriculture and the Mechanic Arts (now the University of New Hampshire) in 1914, Baker University in Baldwin City, Kansas in 1915, and Trinity College of in Hartford, Connecticut in 1919, compiling a career coaching record of 8–13–2.

Biography

Shepherd graduated from Wellesley High School in Massachusetts, and initially attended Wesleyan College in Connecticut, where he was a member of their 1908 football team, then entered the University of Maine in his sophomore year. He played football for Maine from 1910 to 1912, where he was noted "because of his punting, field goals and aggressiveness as a back." In an October 1910 game, he successfully kicked four field goals, which was notable in that era. A fullback, he was captain of the 1912 team. He also competed in track and field for Maine, in the hammer throw and shot put. He was a member of Psi Upsilon fraternity.

Shepherd served as head coach of the New Hampshire football team at New Hampshire College of Agriculture and the Mechanic Arts in Durham, New Hampshire, in 1914, where he compiled a 1–6–2 record. In 1915, he was appointed head football coach, director of gymnasium, and manager of athletics at Baker University in Baldwin City, Kansas. In 1916, Shepherd  was athletic director at Maine Central Institute, a private boarding school. He coached the 1919 football team of Trinity College in Hartford, Connecticut, taking over during the season following the resignation of his predecessor. He led the team to a 2–4 record. He was also athletic director and football coach at Manlius Academy (now Manlius Pebble Hill School) near Syracuse, New York.

Shepherd had three brothers, was married, and had one son. During World War I, he served in the United States Navy. He moved to Elmira, New York, in November 1937, where he worked as an insurance agent until his death. He died in Elmira in October 1954, of a heart attack at age 65.

Head coaching record
Shepherd is listed in the New Hampshire media guide as T.D. Sheppard, and in the Trinity media guide as T. Shepard. In the Maine media guide, he appears in the list of all-time lettermen as Thomas D. Shepard.

Notes

References

1889 births
1954 deaths
American football fullbacks
American male hammer throwers
American male shot putters
Baker Wildcats athletic directors
Baker Wildcats football coaches
Maine Black Bears football players
Maine Black Bears men's track and field athletes
Trinity Bantams football coaches
Wesleyan Cardinals football players
New Hampshire Wildcats football coaches
Wellesley High School alumni
United States Navy personnel of World War I
People from Belmont, Massachusetts
People from Wellesley, Massachusetts
Sportspeople from Middlesex County, Massachusetts
Sportspeople from Norfolk County, Massachusetts
Coaches of American football from Massachusetts
Players of American football from Massachusetts
Track and field athletes from Massachusetts